The Men's Indoor Pan American Cup is an international indoor hockey competition for men and women organised by the Pan American Hockey Federation (PAHF). The tournament started in the year 2002 for both men's and women's competition.

Apart from 2004 and 2008 edition, the winner (for 2002, 2005 and 2010, including runner-up) of each tournament was awarded an automatic berth to the Men's World Cup and the Women's World Cup, as the continental champion.

Results

Successful national teams

* = host nation

Team appearances

See also
Men's Pan American Cup
Women's Indoor Pan American Cup

References

External links
Pan American Hockey Federation

 
International field hockey competitions in the Americas
Recurring sporting events established in 2002
Pan American cup